Abbaiah Narayanaswamy is an Indian politician who is the current Minister of State for Social Justice and Empowerment of India in the Second Modi ministry since 7 July 2021. He is also a member of the Lok Sabha, lower house of the Parliament of India from Chitradurga, Karnataka as a member of the Bharatiya Janata Party. It became a controversy when he was denied entry into village of Pemmanahalli Gollarahatti in Pavagada taluk of Tumakuru district in his own constituency as he belongs to Madiga community.

References

External links
 Official biographical sketch in Parliament of India website

India MPs 2019–present
Lok Sabha members from Karnataka
Living people
Bharatiya Janata Party politicians from Karnataka
1957 births
People from Chitradurga